Timothy Ginever (born 13 April 1966) is a former Australian rules footballer in the South Australian National Football League (SANFL), playing for Port Adelaide.

Early life 
Tim Ginever is the seventh of 10 children and says that Australian Football helped his English father and South American mother transition into Australian life.

Football 
Ginever made his SANFL debut as a 17-year-old rover in 1983. If you were to undertake a detailed objective assessment of Tim Ginever's football ability - marking, kicking, pace, ball skills and so forth - you might conceivably end up wondering how they could possibly be combined to produce a player of league standard. Tim Ginever, however, was much more than just an average league player; he was arguably one of the most important SANFL footballers of the 1980s and 1990s, and provided conclusively persuasive evidence that success in football is at least as much attributable to mental as to physical capabilities.

When Tim Ginever entered the playing arena he became so consumed by white line fever as to metamorphose, almost literally, into a completely different person from the happy-go-lucky larrikin who confronted the TV cameras during post-match interviews. Tough, intense, courageous and dynamic, he was the heartbeat of a Port Adelaide side that won no fewer than seven SANFL premierships between 1988 and 1996. For the flags of 1994-1995-1996 Ginever led from the front as team captain, and the longer his 314-game league career went on, the better he played.
In 1994 he was appointed captain of Port Adelaide, and captained his club from 1994 to 1997, after which he retired. Ginever got better with age and as captain, winning his club's best and fairest award in 1994 and 1997 (his final year).  His SANFL club made the Grand Final in all four of Ginever's captaincy years and they won the premiership on three of these occasions.

Coaching 
Ginever was appointed assistant coach of the Port Adelaide Magpies in 2005 under the legendary John Cahill, who was brought back as coach for one year while Ginever served his apprenticeship. Ginever then took over as coach in 2006 for four seasons but was not able to reproduce the same success he had as a player. On 14 August 2009, Ginever announced his retirement from coaching at the end of the 2009 SANFL minor round. In a statement issued by the Port Adelaide Magpies Football Club, it says the decision was a mutual one between Ginever and the Club's Board. Ginever himself was quoted "I only gave up Coaching due to popular demand"

Role in Port Adelaide reunification 
Tim was actively involved in the OnePAFC campaign designed to garner support for the reunification of the Port Adelaide Football Club and the Port Adelaide Magpies Football Club. As of 2011 the two clubs are a single and administrative legal entity. In 2014 the club's players not named in the AFL would play for the club in the SANFL.

Football commentary 
He is now working for Adelaide radio station 5AA, part of  Australian rules football coverage and street reporter for the Breakfast Show in 2011 & 2012. Known for his quick wit and larrikin sense of humour off the field, Ginever has also worked as a football commentator for radio station Triple M. He is the current Special Comments man on Ch 7 coverage of the SANFL. Mon to Fri he is the Commercial Sales Manager for PAFC responsible for Sponsorship & Hospitality revenue at the club.

Honours 
In 2015, Ginever was inducted into the South Australian Football Hall of Fame.

References

External links 

Official Website of the Port Adelaide Magpies Football Club
2002 ABC interview with Tim Ginever about the history of the Port Adelaide football club
One Port Adelaide Football Club

Australian rules footballers from South Australia
Port Adelaide Football Club (SANFL) players
Port Adelaide Football Club players (all competitions)
Port Adelaide Magpies coaches
1966 births
Living people
South Australian Football Hall of Fame inductees